Hasel Qubi-ye Amirabad (also Romanized as Ḩāşel Qūbī-ye Amīrābād; also known as Ḩāşel Qū’ī-ye Amīrābād) is a village in Marhemetabad Rural District, in the Central District of Miandoab County, West Azerbaijan Province, Iran.

History 
At the 2006 census, its population was 694, in 164 families.

References 

Populated places in Miandoab County